was a Japanese novelist, singer, lyricist, and member of the House of Councillors.

Early life 
Nosaka was born in Kamakura, Kanagawa, the son of Sukeyuki Nosaka, who was an official of the Tokyo Metropolitan Bureau of Construction. Together with his sisters he grew up as an adopted child of a Harimaya family in Nada, Kobe, Hyōgo. His foster mother, Aiko, was his maternal aunt. Nosaka is part of the "Generation of the Ashes", which includes other writers like Kenzaburō Ōe and Makoto Oda.

One of his sisters died as the result of malnutrition, and his adoptive father died during the 1945 bombing of Kobe in World War II. Another sister died of malnutrition in Fukui. Nosaka would later base his short story "Grave of the Fireflies" on these experiences.

Career 
Nosaka is well known for children's stories about war. Two of his short stories, "Grave of the Fireflies" and "American Hijiki", won the 58th Naoki Prize in 1967. He is also noted for his preference for sexually explicit material and distinctive writing style, which has been likened to the comic-prose of the seventeenth-century Japanese writer Ihara Saikaku. His novel The Pornographers was translated into English by Michael Gallagher and published in 1968. It was also adapted into a live-action film, The Pornographers, directed by Shōhei Imamura. In December 1978, Nosaka was credited for giving former rugby player-turned pro wrestler Susumu Hara his ring name, Ashura Hara.

He was elected to the Japanese Diet in 1983. Nosaka suffered a stroke in 2003 and although still affected by it, he kept writing a column for the daily Mainichi Shimbun.

On NHK's December 10, 2015 7:00 pm broadcast announcing Nosaka's death, a veteran journalist was quoted as saying Nosaka was notable for questioning what most people consider common sense, but Japan has now entered an era in which this is no longer possible.

The 1988 anime film Grave of the Fireflies, directed by Isao Takahata, was based on Nosaka's short story of the same name.

Selected works 
 TV commercial and magazine articles (1950s)
  (1963); English translation by Michael Gallagher, 
  (1967); English translation included in The Penguin Book of Japanese Short Stories (2017), Jay Rubin ed.
  (1967); English translation by James R. Abrams, published in an issue of the Japan Quarterly (1978)
 ; English translation by Ginny Tapley Takemori (2015), 
 The Cake Tree in the Ruins; English translation by Ginny Tapley Takemori (2018),

References

External links 

 Akiyuki Nosaka's official home page   
  J'Lit | Authors : Akiyuki Nosaka* | Books from Japan

1930 births
2015 deaths
20th-century Japanese novelists
21st-century Japanese novelists
Members of the House of Councillors (Japan)
People from Kamakura
Writers from Kanagawa Prefecture
Male novelists
Musicians from Kanagawa Prefecture
Politicians from Kanagawa Prefecture
20th-century Japanese male writers
21st-century male writers